MV Lochalsh was a side-loading turntable ferry, built in 1957 for the Caledonian Steam Packet Company for the Kyle of Lochalsh - Skye crossing. Superseded by larger, drive-through vessels, she was renamed MV Scalpay and moved to Scalpay where she served until 1977.

History 
MV Lochalsh was built in 1957 for the Kyle of Lochalsh to Kyleakin crossing, replacing an earlier vessel of that name.

Renamed MV Scalpay, ownership passed to David MacBrayne, although she was operated by the MacSween family. She remained in MacBrayne ownership, not transferring to Caledonian MacBrayne Holdings Ltd. in 1973.

Once superseded at Scalpay, she lay at Lochaline until May 1978 when she was towed to Crinan, making her own way through the canal and a further tow to Shandon. She ended her days as a barge on the Ayrshire coast.

Layout
She had side ramps and could carry six cars but had no passenger lounge.

For service at Scalpay, her ramps were remodelled with angled ends to suit the steeper slipways.>

Service
Lochalsh proved extremely reliable at Kyleakin, being joined by further side-loading vessels on the increasingly busy service until 1970. In anticipation of the arrival of two new drive-through ferries, her sister Kyleakin II spent the 1970 summer season at Scalpay, Outer Hebrides. This was so successful that Lochalsh (as Scalpay) became the regular vessel there, remaining until replaced by Morvern on 12 January 1977.

Scalpay was beached to await her fate. In July and August she provided service as the Corran Ferry across the narrows of Loch Linnhe, although troubled by breakdowns.

References

Caledonian MacBrayne
1957 ships